Medina is a city in Gibson County, Tennessee, United States. The population was 5,126 at the 2020 census, Medina is included in Jackson-Humboldt, Tenn. metropolitan statistical area (MSA).

Geography
Medina is located in southern Gibson County centered around  (35.805376, -88.780904). The city is contained within two separate areas connected by part of Blackmon Rd.; a small part of its southern border follows the Madison County line.

Demographics

2020 census

As of the 2020 United States census, there were 5,126 people, 1,495 households, and 1,159 families residing in the city.

2000 census
As of the census of 2000, there were 969 people, 414 households, and 279 families residing in the city. The population density was 385.3 people per square mile (149.1/km2). There were 459 housing units at an average density of 182.5 per square mile (70.6/km2). The racial makeup of the city was 97.73% White, 1.34% African American, 0.10% Native American, 0.10% from other races, and 0.72% from two or more races. Hispanic or Latino of any race were 0.62% of the population.

There were 414 households, out of which 34.3% had children under the age of 18 living with them, 54.6% were married couples living together, 9.7% had a female householder with no husband present, and 32.4% were non-families. 28.7% of all households were made up of individuals, and 12.1% had someone living alone who was 65 years of age or older. The average household size was 2.34 and the average family size was 2.88.

In the city, the population was spread out, with 24.3% under the age of 18, 8.8% from 18 to 24, 34.1% from 25 to 44, 19.1% from 45 to 64, and 13.8% who were 65 years of age or older. The median age was 34 years. For every 100 females, there were 81.8 males. For every 100 females age 18 and over, there were 83.5 males.

The median income for a household in the city was $36,382, and the median income for a family was $40,804. Males had a median income of $33,958 versus $22,059 for females. The per capita income for the city was $19,445. About 8.4% of families and 10.2% of the population were below the poverty line, including 9.0% of those under age 18 and 14.3% of those age 65 or over.

Local schools in Medina, administered by the Gibson County Special School District Board of Trustees in Dyer, Tenn., include South Gibson Elementary School (Kindergarten thru 4th grade), South Gibson Middle School (5th grade thru 8th grade), and South Gibson High School (9th grade thru 12th grade).

Media
 WTPR-AM 710 "The Greatest Hits of All Time"

References

External links

City of Medina official website

Cities in Tennessee
Cities in Gibson County, Tennessee